William or Bill Ramsey may refer to:

Politics
 William Ramsey (Pennsylvania politician) (1779–1831), United States Congressman from Pennsylvania
 William Sterrett Ramsey (1810–1840), United States congressman from Pennsylvania
 William Marion Ramsey (1846–1937), American politician and judge in Oregon
 William T. Ramsey (1873–1937), American politician from Pennsylvania

Sports
 Bill Ramsey (baseball) (1920–2008), Major League baseball outfielder
 Bill Ramsey (rugby league) (1943–2020), British rugby league footballer

Other
 William of Ramsey (fl. 1219), English hagiographer and Benedictine monk
 William de Ramsey (fl. 1323 – d.1349), English master mason and architect
 William Ramsay (Royal Navy officer) (1796–1871), British admiral
 William F. Ramsey (1855–1922), Justice of the Supreme Court of Texas
 Bill Ramsey (singer) (William McCreery Ramsey, 1931–2021), German-American jazz and pop singer and actor

See also
William Ramsay (disambiguation)